Tony Newell (born 5 April 1982 in Kendal) is a professional English darts player who plays in Professional Darts Corporation events.

He earned a PDC Tour Card in 2014 and 2016, and qualified for the 2016 UK Open, but lost in the third round to Adrian Lewis.

References

External links
Profile and stats on Darts Database

1982 births
Living people
English darts players
Sportspeople from Kendal
Professional Darts Corporation former tour card holders